Tyler Bryant, better known as his stage name Velous, is an American rapper, singer, songwriter, and record producer from Kingston, New York. He is mostly known for co-writing Chris Brown and Drake's "No Guidance" which received a Grammy nomination for Best R&B song, and is currently 8x platinum. Velous is also known for co-producing Kanye West's hit single "All Day", which was Platinum-certified in the US and subsequently procured a Grammy nomination for Best Rap Song. In 2016, Velous wrote and produced "Flipmode." In 2017, "Flipmode" became a single on Fabolous' Summertime Shootout 3 and served as Velous' debut feature. “When I heard the track it was a dope vibe, so I knew I wanted to become a part of the song. Chris added his touch while we were on tour together and the rest is history,” said Fabolous.

Early life
Tyler Bryant was born in Kingston, New York. His father, deceased, was a musician. His mother was a singer. When he was eleven, he began rapping after listening to Kanye West's "Through the Wire". He learned how to play the drums, then piano, and started playing the guitar when he was twelve years old. He started getting into production when he was thirteen. He was also in a jazz ensemble in high school.

Career
Velous came up with his name after someone told him how marvelous his production skills were; the name is "marvelous" minus the "mar". In 2011, he released his debut mixtape, Velocity The Mixtape. The release helped Velous gain attention from Cus Maven, who signed him to Swanky Music Group. Velous met Fabolous through fellow producer Vinylz, who Velous had frequently worked with during the past year. Vinylz and Velous went to Fabolous' studio to check out what he was doing. Velous ended up playing some of his music, which Fabolous liked. The two ended up recording the song "Gone For The Winter" for Fab's album The Young OG Project in 2014.

In 2014, French Montana signed him to his label, Coke Boys Records. Montana spoke about Velous in an interview with the Village Voice: "I love his style. He sings. He raps. He's everything in one." He revealed that Velous also impressed Kanye West. "He came to the studio and played me like 1,000 songs", he said, before adding that Kanye West picked "like two beats" from Velous.

Discography

Singles

Features

Awards and nominations

Production and Songwriting Credits
List of songs as producer, co-producer, or songwriter with performing artists and other credited producers, showing year released and album name.

References

External links
Velous on Soundcloud

African-American record producers
Singers from New York (state)
21st-century American singers
Rappers from New York (state)
American hip hop record producers
1991 births
Living people
21st-century American rappers
21st-century African-American musicians